Aleksandr Shelkovnikov (30 July 1937 – 5 December 2011) was a Soviet sailor. He competed at the 1960 Summer Olympics and the 1964 Summer Olympics.

References

External links
 

1937 births
2011 deaths
Soviet male sailors (sport)
Olympic sailors of the Soviet Union
Sailors at the 1960 Summer Olympics – Flying Dutchman
Sailors at the 1964 Summer Olympics – Flying Dutchman
Sportspeople from Moscow